The Tulija River is a river of Mexico.

See also
List of rivers of Mexico
Xanil River

References

The Prentice Hall American World Atlas, 1984.
Rand McNally, The New International Atlas, 1993.

Rivers of Chiapas
Rivers of Tabasco
Grijalva River